Camilo Andrés Vargas Gil (born 9 March 1989) is a Colombian professional footballer who plays as a goalkeeper for Liga MX club Atlas and the Colombia national team.

Career

Deportivo Cali
After being loaned out to Deportivo Cali from July 2016 to July 2017, and later the 2018 season, Deportivo Cali confirmed that they had redeemed the player's purchase option and signed a contract until 2021 with the goalkeeper.

Atlas
On 6 July 2019, Vargas was confirmed as a new player in Club Atlas. In 2021, Vargas was the undisputed starter for the team, including the final for the Mexican tournament (La Liga MX) against Leon for away and home matches. During the away game he was partly responsible for an error which ended in a goal for Leon. However, during the home match he played a role keeping the zero including the extra time. The match ended going for the penalties round where he made two saves giving Atlas the win. This title ended a 70 years hiatus for the team.

International career
Since the 2014 FIFA World Cup qualifiers, Vargas has been consistently called-up in the Colombia national football team by manager José Pekerman. Despite being included in the World Cup squad, he made his debut against El Salvador at the Red Bull Arena in New Jersey on 10 October 2014, that Colombia won, 3-0.

In May 2018, he was included in the Colombia preliminary 35 man team for the 2018 World Cup, in Russia.

Career statistics

International

Honours
Independiente Santa Fe
Categoría Primera A: 2012-I, 2014-II
Copa Colombia: 2009
Superliga Colombiana: 2013

Atlético Nacional
Categoría Primera A: 2015-II

Atlas
Liga MX: Apertura 2021, Clausura 2022
Campeón de Campeones: 2022

Individual
Liga MX Best XI: Apertura 2021, Clausura 2022
Liga MX Balón de Oro: 2021–22
Liga MX Golden Glove: 2021–22
Liga MX All-Star: 2022

References

External links

1989 births
Living people
Footballers from Bogotá
Colombian footballers
Categoría Primera A players
Argentine Primera División players
Liga MX players
Independiente Santa Fe footballers
Atlético Nacional footballers
Argentinos Juniors footballers
Deportivo Cali footballers
Atlas F.C. footballers
Colombia youth international footballers
2014 FIFA World Cup players
2015 Copa América players
2018 FIFA World Cup players
2019 Copa América players
2021 Copa América players
Colombia international footballers
Colombia under-20 international footballers
Colombian expatriate footballers
Expatriate footballers in Argentina
Expatriate footballers in Mexico
Colombian expatriate sportspeople in Argentina
Association football goalkeepers